César Évora Díaz (born November 4, 1959, in Havana, Cuba) is a Cuban-Mexican actor.

Biography 
Évora started his career in Cuba appearing in more than ten movies before moving to Mexico in the early 1990s. He became known for playing minor roles in the seminal Corazón salvaje and the long-running Agujetas de color de rosa in 1993 and 1994, respectively. In 1995, Évora had his first leading role playing opposite Daniela Romo in Si Dios Me Quita La Vida.

Leading roles in Luz Clarita, Gente bien and especially El Privilegio de Amar soon established Évora as one of the most popular leading men in the industry. He has maintained a high profile after performances in successful productions such as La Madrastra, La esposa virgen, and Mundo de Fieras. He recently acted in telenovelas Al diablo con los guapos, En nombre del amor, Triunfo del Amor, Abismo de pasión and Amor Bravío. He will star as the villain in Salvador Mejía's new telenovela: La tempestad. In addition, he will have a special participation in Nathalie Lartilleux's telenovela: Corazón indomable.

Évora acquired Mexican citizenship in 1999.

Personal life
Évora is divorced from his first wife. He is currently married to Vivian Domínguez and has three children.

Films

Telenovelas

Series and theater

Awards and nominations

Premios INTE

People en Español

See also

List of Cubans
List of Mexicans

References 

1959 births
Cuban emigrants to Mexico
Male actors from Havana
Mexican male film actors
Mexican male stage actors
Mexican male telenovela actors
Naturalized citizens of Mexico
Living people